Administrative Council elections were held in Dahomey in 1928.

Electoral system
Three members of the Administrative Council were elected from single-member constituencies; Abomey, Ouidah and Porto-Novo. However, the franchise was extremely restricted.

Campaign
In 1927 the La Voix newspaper was established by political activists in Dahomey. It supported anti-colonial candidates in the elections.

Results
The candidates supported by La Voix won in all three constituencies; Pierre Johnson was re-elected in Ouidah, whilst the pro-French candidates were defeated in the other two constituencies.

References

1928 elections in Africa
1928
1928 in French Dahomey
1928